Dreamer may refer to:

General use
 A person experiencing a dream
 An idealist
 A recipient of DACA

Arts, entertainment, and media

Music

Albums
 Dreamer (Bobby Bland album), 1974
 Dreamer (Haste the Day album), 2008
 Dreamer (Caldera album), 1979
 Dreamer (Emmerson Nogueira album), 2008
 Dreamer (Soraya Arnelas album), 2010
 Dreamer, a 1967 album by Labelle
 Dreamer, a Japanese-language album by Hound Dog
 Dreamer (Eliane Elias album), 2004

Songs
 "Dreamer" (Antônio Carlos Jobim song), 1962
 "Dreamer" (Axwell & Ingrosso song), 2017
 "Dreamer" (Chris Brown song), 2008
 "Dreamer" (Dennis Wilson song), 1977
 "Dreamer" (Europe song), 1984
 "Dreamer" (Livin' Joy song), 1994
 "Dreamer" (Ozzy Osbourne song), 2001
 "Dreamer" (Martin Garrix song), 2018
 "Dreamer" (Supertramp song), 1974
 "Dreamer" (Tune in Tokyo song), 2010
 "Dreamer", from The B. B. & Q. Band's 1985 album Genie
 "Dreamer", from Hilary Duff's third studio album, Dignity
 "Dreamer", from the Jacksons' self-titled 1976 album, The Jacksons
 "Dreamer", from Prince's 2009 album LOtUSFLOW3R
 "Dreamer", from Toni Childs' album Union
 "Dreamer", from Uriah Heep's album Sweet Freedom
 "Dreamer", from Charli XCX's mixtape Number 1 Angel
 "Dreamer", from Trippie Redd's (reissue) album Neon Shark vs Pegasus

Other uses in arts, entertainment, and media
 Dreamer (1979 film), a 1979 Bowling film
 Dreamer (2005 film), a 2005 film starring Dakota Fanning and Kurt Russell
 Dreamer (advertisement), a 2001 advertising campaign for Guinness
 Dreamer (novel), a 1988 novel by Daniel Quinn
 Nia Nal, also known as Dreamer, a fictional character in the TV series Supergirl

Other uses
 DREAMer, an immigrant who was illegally brought into the United States as a minor and who would qualify for resident status under the DREAM Act
 Tommy Dreamer (born 1971), WWE and ECW hardcore wrestler
 Dreamers, a common name for the deep-sea anglerfishes family Oneirodidae
 Voyah Dreamer, an electric car

See also
 Beautiful Dreamer (disambiguation)
 Dream (disambiguation)
 Dream Lover (disambiguation)
 Dreaming (disambiguation)
 The Dreamer (disambiguation)
 The Dreamers (disambiguation)